John Lawrence Cardy FRS (born 19 March 1947, England) is a British-American theoretical physicist at the University of California, Berkeley. He is best known for his work in theoretical condensed matter physics and statistical mechanics, and in particular for research on critical phenomena and two-dimensional conformal field theory.

He was an undergraduate and postgraduate student at Downing College, University of Cambridge, before moving to the University of California, Santa Barbara, where he joined the faculty in 1977. In 1993, he moved to the University of Oxford, where until 2014 he was a Fellow of All Souls College (now Emeritus) and a Professor of Physics in the Rudolf Peierls Centre for Theoretical Physics. He currently holds a Visiting Professorship at the University of California, Berkeley.

He was elected as a Fellow of the Royal Society in 1991, received the Dirac Medal of the IoP in 2000, was awarded the Lars Onsager Prize by the APS in 2004, the Boltzmann Medal by IUPAP in 2010, and the Dirac Medal of the International Centre for Theoretical Physics in 2011.

He is most known for his contributions to conformal field theory. The Cardy formula for black hole entropy, the Cardy formula in percolation theory, and the Cardy conditions in boundary conformal field theory are named after him.

Selected works
 Scaling and renormalization in statistical physics. Cambridge University Press, 1996
 with Krzysztof Gawędzki, Gregory Falkovich: Non equilibrium statistical mechanics and turbulence. London Mathematical Society Lecture notes, Cambridge University Press, 2008
 Conformal Invariance and Statistical Mechanics. in Les Houches Lectures, vol. 49, 1988
 as editor: Finite Size Scaling. Elsevier 1988
 Cardy Conformal Invariance in Percolation, Self-Avoiding Walks and Related Problems, 2002
 Cardy Conformal field theory and statistical mechanics, Les Houches Lectures 2008
 Cardy, Pasquale Calabrese Entanglement entropy and conformal field theory, J. Phys. A, 42, 2009
 Cardy Entanglement entropy in extended quantum systems, 2007

References

External links
 John Cardy's homepage

Living people
British physicists
American physicists
Alumni of Downing College, Cambridge
Fellows of All Souls College, Oxford
Fellows of Downing College, Cambridge
Institute for Advanced Study visiting scholars
Fellows of the Royal Society
1947 births